Kabalo is a town in the Democratic Republic of the Congo.  It is in Tanganyika province on the Lualaba River and is the administrative center of Kabalo territory.

Transport 
Kabalo is the junction of railway lines to the north and to Lake Tanganyika in the east.

It is served by Kabalo Airport.

See also 
 Railway stations in DRCongo

External links
 A Trans-Africa Inland Waterway System?
 Democratic Republic of Congo Waterways Assessment

References 

Populated places in Tanganyika Province